This page lists the members of Santa Monica College, including students, alumni, faculty and academic affiliates associated.

Alumni

Arts and entertainment

Paul Thomas Anderson, film director
Lloyd Avery II, actor
Penn Badgley, actor
Steven Blum, voice actor
Daniele Bolelli, author, podcaster
 Mark Bradford, artist
Chikezie, musician, American Idol  finalist
Rivers Cuomo, musician (Weezer)
Phire Dawson, game show model, one of Barker's Beauties
James Dean, actor
Matt Deitsch, film director and freelance photographer
John Densmore, drummer for The Doors
Daniel DeWeldon, actor
Cliff Eidelman, musician
Jack Elam, actor
Emma Ferreira,  artist, sculptor, photographer, and philanthropist
Andrea Fay Friedman, actor
Cam Gigandet, actor (Twilight)
Josh Haden, musician
Dustin Hoffman, actor
Marco Hofschneider, actor
Rickie Lee Jones, musician
Mahira Khan, actor
Sandra Knight, actor
Robby Krieger, musician (The Doors)
Alison Lohman, actor
Teena Marie, singer
Yael Markovich, Israeli/American model and beauty queen/pageant titleholder
Duff McKagan, musician (Guns N' Roses, Velvet Revolver, Loaded)
Kel Mitchell, actor
Mike Muir, musician (Suicidal Tendencies)
Dustin O'Halloran, post-classical pianist and composer
Sean Penn, actor
Kenneth Price, ceramic artist and printmaker
Nick Sagan, novelist and screenwriter
Anita Sarkeesian, video game critic
Kentaro Sato, composer
Arnold Schwarzenegger, actor and 38th Governor of California
Ryan Seacrest, radio personality, television host, network producer and voice actor
Michele Serros, author
SNoW, musician
Gloria Stuart, actor
Kristine Sutherland, actor
Hilary Swank, actor
Kenan Thompson, actor
Tessa Thompson, actor
Frank Welker, voice actor
Gary Zekley, record producer
Will Estes, actor
Ian Kochinski, political YouTube livestreamer

Sports

John Adams, former NFL player
Laila Ali, boxer
Isaac Bruce, former NFL player
Ralph Anderson, former NFL player
Glenn Cowan, table tennis player and Sino-American diplomat
Vic Darensbourg, MLB pitcher
Thelma "Tiby" Eisen (1922-2014), baseball player
George Farmer, former NFL player
Anthony Frederick, former professional basketball player
Lee Grosscup, former NFL player and broadcaster
John Harris, former NFL player
Barry Jaeckel, professional golfer
Chad Johnson, former NFL wide receiver
Jimmy Johnson, pro football hall of famer
Brian Kingman, MLB pitcher
Lenny Krayzelburg, swimmer
Keith Lee, former NFL player
Evan Lysacek, figure skating Olympic gold medalist
Marv Marinovich, former NFL player
Rodney McCray, MLB outfielder
Candice Michelle, wrestler
Fred Miller, former NFL player
David Nwaba, NBA player
Mac O'Grady, golfer
Billy Parks, former NFL player
Rob Picciolo, MLB infielder
Al Scates, winningest volleyball coach in NCAA history
Terry Schofield, former professional basketball player and coach
Steve Smith Sr., former NFL wide receiver
Deshawn Stephens, former professional basketball player
Brian Stewart, NFL and college coach
Sean Whyte, CFL kicker
Sidney Wicks, four-time NBA All-Star and 1972 NBA Rookie of the Year
A. D. Williams, former NFL player
Yehuda Zadok, Israeli Olympic runner

Other

Walter Cunningham, astronaut
Don Edwards, politician
David Geffen, record executive
Hee Sook Lee, businesswoman, founder of BCD Tofu House chain
Monica Lewinsky, White House intern
Nathan Myhrvold, former Microsoft chief technology officer
Phil Remington, motorsports engineer
Arnold Schwarzenegger, 38th Governor of California, actor (A.A. 1977)
Stephen Silberkraus, author,  Nevada State Assemblyman
Helen Singleton, civil rights activist and Freedom Rider
Larry Stevenson, inventor, skateboarder pro
Nick Webster, soccer commentator and Fox Soccer Channel personality
Inonge Wina, Vice President of Zambia

Faculty
 Salvador Carrasco, film director (The Other Conquest) and head of SMC's Film Production Program
 Andy Hill (born c. 1950), 3x college national champion basketball player, President of CBS Productions and Channel One News, author, and motivational speaker
 Victor Millan (aka, Joseph Brown), actor; dean of the theatre arts department

References

Lists of people by university or college in California